L'été en pente douce (Summer on a gentle slope) is a French film, an adaptation of a novel by Pierre Pelot. It was directed by Gérard Krawczyk, and released in 1987.

Synopsis
Following the death of his mother, Stephane Leheurt, nicknamed Fane (Jean-Pierre Bacri), rejoins his mentally handicapped brother Maurice, nicknamed Mo, (Jacques Villeret) at their mother's house. He wants a quiet life with his brother and his pretty girlfriend Lilas (Pauline Lafont). But Voke the neighbouring garage owner has eyes on the house, and on Lilas.

Cast
 Jacques Villeret - Maurice Leheurt, nicknamed Mo
 Jean-Pierre Bacri - Stéphane Leheurt, Fane
 Pauline Lafont - Lilas
 Jean Bouise - Olivier Voke
 Guy Marchand - André Voke
 Jean-Paul Lilienfeld - Shawenhick
 Jacques Mathou - Jeannot
 Dominique Besnehard - Leval
 Claude Chabrol - the priest
 Patrick Braoudé - the policeman
 Charles Varel - the packer

External links
 IMDb entry

1987 films
French comedy-drama films
Films directed by Gérard Krawczyk
1980s French films